Mohammad Yousuf Ali Mollah is a Bangladeshi professor and educator. He served as the acting chairman of University Grants Commission of Bangladesh (UGC) in May 2019.

Early life
Mollah graduated in Chemistry from Dhaka University in 1969. He completed his post graduation in Physical-Inorganic chemistry from the same university in 1970. He received his Ph.D. in Chemistry from Macquarie University in 1979.

Career
Mollah was a lecturer at the chemistry department of Jahangirnagar University from March 1972 to March 1975. He joined the chemistry department of Dhaka University in June 1981 as an assistant professor and he was made professor in July 1993. He also serves as Dean of faculty of science.

Before assuming the post of chairman, Mollah was one of the full-time members of UGC. He was selected as a full-time member on 28 May 2015. He was appointed by the Ministry of Education as chairman on 8 May 2019.

References

Living people
University of Dhaka alumni
Academic staff of the University of Dhaka
Year of birth missing (living people)
Macquarie University alumni